The Eurovision Song Contest is an annual international song competition, held by the European Broadcasting Union (EBU) since 1956. This page is a list of cities and venues that have hosted the contest, one or more times.

The contest has frequently been held in a capital city.

Host cities

Special events

Hosting traditions and exceptions

A number of exceptions to this rule have occurred since, typically when the winning country had already hosted the event in the recent past. These exceptions are listed below:

 —hosted by the BBC in London when the Netherlands' NTS declined due to expense, having previously hosted the 1958 contest.
The second- and third-placed Monaco and Luxembourg also declined when offered hosting duties.
 —hosted by the NOS in Amsterdam following a ballot to determine the host country, after the  produced four winning countries.
 —hosted by the BBC in Edinburgh when Monaco's Télé Monte Carlo was unable to provide a suitable venue. The Monégasque broadcaster invited the BBC to host the event due to their previous experience.
The Dutch offered to host the contest after several other broadcasters, reportedly including runner-up Spain's RTVE and the BBC, were unwilling to do so.
 —to be hosted by the BBC in Liverpool on behalf of Ukraine's UA:PBC, after the EBU decided that Ukraine would not be able to host the event due to security concerns caused by the 2022 Russian invasion of Ukraine.

Host City Insignia

The trophy is a large key ring to which the host cities can attach their city key or other symbol representing the city. The Host City Insignia Exchange usually takes place in conjunction with the Semi-Final Allocation Draw. The insignia is then traditionally put on display in a public place, such as the City Hall or another venue of local significance, for the remainder of the year.

The concept and fob were designed by the Anteeksi group and the key ring by jewellery designer Taru Tonder. Hand-engraved on the ring are the following texts: "Eurovision Song Contest Host City", all host cities up until 2006 and a stamp: "Helsinki 2007" with the initials of the insignia designers. Additionally, the fob has a picture of the Helsinki Senate Square attached to the ring.

Semi-final allocation drawing venue 
Each year, either five or six countries are exempt from the drawing for competing in the semi-finals: the "Big Five" (France, Germany, Italy, Spain, and the United Kingdom) and the host country, if the host is not one of the "Big Five". In , the number of countries exempt was seven, as Australia joined the other six exempt countries as a special guest contestant.

Regardless if a country is exempt from competing in the semi-finals, all participating countries are allotted a semi-final in which to vote.

Running order drawing venue 
Previously, the running order has been determined at a dedicated event.

Receptions and Opening Ceremony venues 
An official Opening Ceremony with a red carpet procession has been held since 2009 at a venue in the host city. Previously a welcome reception was typically held for all participating artists and hosted by the mayor of the host city.

Table key

See also 
 List of ABU Song Festivals host cities
 List of Junior Eurovision Song Contest host cities

Notes

References

Further reading

External links 

 The picture of the insignia on the page of the Eurovision Song Contest Moscow 2009
 A photo on the web pages of the biggest newspaper Helsingin Sanomat with description "Helsinki Mayor Jussi Pajunen (left) and cultural director Pekka Timonen were in Belgrade on Friday to hand over the Helsinki Insignia to the city that will host next year's Eurovision Song Contest." (Helsingin Sanomat)

Host cities, list of
Eurovision Song Contest
Eurovision Song Contest